Joey Don Essex (born 29 July 1990) is an English television personality. From 2011 to 2013, he made appearances on the ITV reality series The Only Way Is Essex. In 2013 he participated in the first series of Splash! and the thirteenth series of I'm a Celebrity...Get Me Out of Here!, where he finished in fourth place. In 2015 he won the Channel 4 series The Jump. In 2022, he participated in the eighth series of the Australian version of I'm a Celebrity...Get Me Out of Here!, finishing in sixth place and in 2023, he participated in the fifteenth series of Dancing on Ice.

Education
Essex attended West Hatch High School in Chigwell, Essex. He left school in 2006, having received a U in Drama, a C in Art and a D in Wood Tech at GCSE. Ten years later, as part of a television series, he added a D in GCSE General Studies, commenting that "I still don't really know what GCSE stands for."

Career

Television
Essex first appeared in The Only Way Is Essex (TOWIE) as a supporting cast member in the second series with his cousin Chloe Sims, but was then promoted to a main cast member in the third series. In 2011 the TOWIE cast recorded and released a single titled "Reem". In 2013 Essex competed in the first series of Splash! where he was eliminated during the "splash-off" in the second heat against television presenter Charlotte Jackson. On 13 November 2013 it was announced that Essex had quit The Only Way Is Essex. Essex also appeared in the thirteenth series of I'm a Celebrity...Get Me Out of Here!, and was voted out on 6 December 2013 after 20 days in the jungle, finishing in fourth place.

In March 2014 Essex starred in a one-off documentary called Educating Joey Essex, taking place in South Africa, narrated by Phillip Schofield. ITV2 later ordered a full series that began in June 2014. In 2016, ITV announced that the series has been picked up for a seven part second series; the series aired in the summer of that year with the first episode titled "The Queen's 90th Birthday". In 2015 Essex won the second series of Channel 4's reality show The Jump in 2015, and in 2016 Essex took part in the E4 reality dating series Celebs Go Dating. It was later confirmed that Essex would return to the show for its second series in 2017.

In 2017 he ranked in fourth place on the Essex Power 100 list, being named the fourth most powerful person in Essex. In 2018 Essex was a guest in the fourth series of BBC One's Michael McIntyre's Big Show. In 2020 Essex appeared on the second series of Celebrity SAS: Who Dares Wins, as well as MTV's Celebrity Ex on the Beach. In 2021 he appeared in the E4 series Celebs Go Dating: The Mansion.

In 2022, he participated in the eighth season of the Australian version of I'm a Celebrity...Get Me Out of Here!, entering the camp as an intruder in the second episode and finishing the show in sixth place. In 2023, Essex came second place on the fifteenth series of Dancing on Ice.

Other ventures
On 8 March 2013, Essex launched a hair products range, Joey Essex: D'Reem Hair. On 23 March 2013, he opened his shop Fusey in Brentwood. The shop closed in 2016. On 12 September 2013, Essex launched two fragrances, Fusey aftershave for men and My Girl perfume for women. In February 2016 Essex appeared in adverts for Batchelors Cup-a-Soup. In May 2017 it was announced that Essex would be launching a clothing line titled DAFDEA.

Personal life
Essex was engaged to fellow TOWIE cast member Sam Faiers, but later split up. They reconciled later in 2012. He then proposed to Faiers again in March 2013 and she accepted. However, the couple split up again on-screen in June 2013 following several arguments between the pair. In October 2014 they announced they had split up "for good".

Essex, whose mother took her own life when he was ten years old, has been an ambassador for Child Bereavement UK since 2014. He addressed her suicide and his grief in the BBC Three documentary Joey Essex: Grief and Me broadcast on 3 June 2021. He lives in Chigwell, Essex.

Filmography

 Guest appearances
All Star Family Fortunes (25 December 2011) – Contestant (TOWIE vs Benidorm) – 1 episode
The Xtra Factor (2011) – Guest
8 Out of 10 Cats (11 November 2011) – Panellist – 1 episode
Daybreak (2011, 21 February 2013) – 2 episodes
Loose Women (2011) – Guest – 1 episode
This Morning (17, 31 August, 15 December 2011, 30 November 2012, 21 February 15 July, 12 December 2013, 28 October 2014) – Guest – 1 episode
The Million Pound Drop Live (2012) – Contestant, with Sam Faiers
Celebrity Juice (29 March & 27 September 2012, 11 April 2013, 15 May & 11 December 2014, 19 March & 22 October 2015, 5 May & 27 October 2016, 18 May & 26 October 2017, 3 May, 1 November & 13 December 2018, 14 November 2019 and 16 & 23 April 2020) – Panellist – 
The Big Quiz (15 April 2012) – Panellist
All Star Mr & Mrs (22 May 2013) – Contestant, with Sam Faiers
Through the Keyhole (28 September 2013) – Celebrity homeowner – 1 episode
Through the Keyhole (4 October 2014) – Panellist – 1 episode
The Cube: Celebrity Special (11 April 2014) – Contestant
Viral Tap (27 April 2014) – Guest
Utterly Outrageous Frock Ups (2014) – Guest
8 Out of 10 Cats Does Countdown (12 September 2014) – Dictionary Corner
Britain's Got More Talent (29 May 2015) – Panellist
Celebrity Benchmark (26 September 2015) – Benchmarker
Release the Hounds (31 October 2015) – Halloween Special – 1 episode 
The Crystal Maze (30 June 2017)
CelebAbility (13 July 2017) – Contestant – 1 episode
The Chase (11 November 2017) – Celebrity special
Michael McIntyre's Big Show (1 December 2018) – Midnight Gameshow Guest
Through the Keyhole (16 February 2019) – Celebrity homeowner
Just Tattoo of Us (Series 5) - Guest host – 1 episode 
Michael McIntyre's The Wheel (December 2020) – Celebrity expert on Dating

Discography

Album

Singles

References

Bibliography

External links
 

1990 births
Living people
English autobiographers
English businesspeople
English television personalities
People from Essex
People from Southwark
I'm a Celebrity...Get Me Out of Here! (British TV series) participants
I'm a Celebrity...Get Me Out of Here! (Australian TV series) participants